David Rowland John Morgan (7 August 1944 in Cranmore, Somerset – 6 November 2018 in Leatherhead, Surrey) was a British racing driver from England. He participated in one Formula One World Championship Grand Prix, the 1975 British Grand Prix in which, like several others, he crashed during a storm in the closing laps.  He was classified 18th and thus scored no championship points.

Driving career

Prior to his single grand prix entry, Morgan raced a Mini in the mid-1960s, and soon moved on to Formula Three. He incurred a 12-month ban for dangerous driving at the end of 1970, after a last corner collision with James Hunt at Crystal Palace, but was subsequently allowed to progress to Formula Atlantic in 1971. This was followed by two seasons in Formula Two, then a return to Formula Atlantic. After his one Grand Prix, he retired from racing until returning in the British Saloon Car Championship in 1980–1981, driving a Mitsubishi Colt Lancer. Morgan also later worked as an engineer to Eric van de Poele, in both Formula One and Formula 3000.

He died on 6 November 2018, following a stroke.

Racing record

Complete Formula One results
(key)

Complete British Saloon / Touring Car Championship results
(key) (Races in bold indicate pole position – 1973–1990 in class) (Races in italics indicate fastest lap – 1 point awarded ?–1989 in class)

† Events with 2 races staged for the different classes.

References

English racing drivers
English Formula One drivers
Surtees Formula One drivers
European Formula Two Championship drivers
British Formula Three Championship drivers
1944 births
2018 deaths
British Touring Car Championship drivers